Ivaylo Traykov (Bulgarian: Ивайло Трайков) is a former professional tennis player from Bulgaria.

Personal
Traykov was born in Sofia, Bulgaria on 17 December 1978, to Toncho, an economist, and Mariana, an engineer. Taking up tennis at the age of 7, Traykov is coached and trained by his father. Traykov enjoys reading books, playing cards and chess, while he considers Pete Sampras to be his idol. His career goal is to break into the top 50 rankings. His favourite shot is the serve, while his favourite surface is hardcourt.

Career

Traykov turned professional in 1995, and has spent the majority of his career playing in Futures and Challengers events. Throughout his career, he has won 1 Challenger tournament and 10 Futures tournaments. Traykov participated in the Wimbledon qualification events in 2000 and 2001, but lost in the first round for both years. He also participated in the Australian Open qualifiers in 2004, winning a match but failing to qualify.

In May 2001, Traykov made it into the main draw of the International Raiffeisen Grand Prix, in Sankt Pölten, as a lucky loser. He defeated Ján Krošlák in the first round, before falling to Ivan Ljubičić in the second round.

In 2006, he was declared the Tennis Player of the Year by the Bulgarian Tennis Federation, and has won five state individual championships (1996–1998, 2004 and 2006).

Traykov has represented Bulgaria in the Davis Cup since 1997, amassing a win–loss record of 8–8 in singles and 8–4 in doubles.

Year-end rankings

Challenger and Futures Finals

Singles: 23 (13–10)

Doubles: 5 (3–2)

Davis Cup 
Ivaylo Traykov debuted for the Bulgaria Davis Cup team in 1997. Since then he has 16 nominations with 20 ties played, his singles W/L record is 8–8 and doubles W/L record is 8–6 (16–14 overall).

Singles (8–8)

Doubles (8–6) 

 RPO = Relegation playoff
 RR = Round robin

External links

References

1978 births
Living people
Bulgarian male tennis players
Sportspeople from Sofia